Wragg is a surname. Notable people with the name include:

 Arthur Wragg (1903—76), British illustrator
 Doug Wragg (born 1934), English soccer player
 Geoff Wragg  (1930–2017), Racehorse trainer
 Harry Wragg (1902—85), British jockey and trainer
 Sir Herbert Wragg (1880—1956), British Conservative Party politician, Member of Parliament (MP) for Belper 1923–29 and 1931–45
 Kaye Wragg (born 1973), English actress
 Peter Wragg (1931—2004), English soccer player
 Ted Wragg (1938—2005), British educationalist
 Ulamila Kurai Wragg (born 1968), Fijian journalist
 Willie Wragg (1875—after 1904), English soccer player
 William Wragg,  British Conservative Party politician, MP for Hazel Grove since May 2015
 Peter Wragg (1946-2012), Award winning Visual Effects designer noted for BBC Doctor Who, Red Dwarf & Gerry Anderson’s Thunderbirds

See also
 E. Wragg & Son, Pipe organ builders
 Wragge, a surname
 Richie Wraggs (fictional)